Casale may refer to:

Casalis, medieval Latin for a group of houses in the countryside

Places in Italy

Communes 
 Casal di Principe in the province of Caserta, Campania
 Casal Velino in the province of Salerno, Campania
 Casalattico, when part of the Duchy of Sora, was known as Casale
 Casale Borgone, former name of Casalborgone in the province of Turin, Piedmont
 Casale Corte Cerro in the province of Verbano-Cusio-Ossola, Piedmont
 Casale Cremasco-Vidolasco in the province of Cremona, Lombardy
 Casale di Scodosia in the province of Padua, Veneto
 Casale Grande, former name of Casalgrande, near Modena in the province of Reggio Emilia, Emilia-Romagna
 Casale Litta in the province of Varese, Lombardy
 Casale Maggiore, former name of Casalmaggiore in the province of Cremona, Lombardy
 Casale Marittimo in the province of Pisa, Tuscany
 Casale Monferrato in the province of Alessandria, Piedmont
 Casale F.B.C., an association football club
 Casale sul Sile in the province of Treviso, Veneto
 Conca Casale, in the province of Isernia, Molise
 Roccacasale in the Province of L'Aquila, Abruzzo
 San Pietro in Casale in the province of Bologna, Emilia-Romagna

Other localities 
 Casalsottano, a frazione of San Mauro Cilento, in the province of Salerno, Campania
 Casale (Pignone), a frazione of Pignone in the province of La Spezia, Liguria
 Casale Buttano, former name of Casalbuttano, the principal centre of Casalbuttano ed Uniti in the province of Cremona, Lombardy

Other uses
 Casale (surname)
 Villa Romana del Casale in the town of Piazza Armerina in the province of Enna

See also
 Casali, a surname